The Daytime Emmy Award for Outstanding Younger Actress in a Drama Series was an award presented annually by the National Academy of Television Arts and Sciences (NATAS) and the Academy of Television Arts & Sciences (ATAS). It was given annually from 1985 to 2019 to honor a young actress below the age of 25, who had delivered an outstanding performance in a role while working within the daytime drama industry.

At the 12th Daytime Emmy Awards held in 1985, Tracey E. Bregman was the first winner of this award, for her role of Lauren Fenmore on The Young and the Restless. The awards ceremony had not been aired on television for the prior two years, having been criticized for voting integrity. The award was originally called Outstanding Ingenue in a Drama Series, the criteria of the new category were deemed confusing, performers of differing ages were nominated, and critics argued some were of supporting or lead actress standards. Adding to the confusion, the first winner, Bregman, and the Outstanding Supporting Actress winner that year, Beth Maitland, played characters near to the same age. The category was re-named Outstanding Juvenile Female in a Drama Series in 1989, and began using its current title in 1991. The criteria were later altered, requiring that the actress be aged 25 or below.

The award was presented to 23 actresses. The Young and the Restless has the most recipients of this award, with a total of eight. Since 2008, Jennifer Landon had been tied with Jennifer Finnigan for most wins, with three each. In 1999, Heather Tom became the most nominated actress in the category, when she was nominated a seventh time, also winning a second time that year. She was nominated again the following year, holding the title with eight nominations; however, she lost to Camryn Grimes. In 2000, Grimes also became the youngest recipient of the award, winning at the age of 10.

At the 2019 ceremony, Hayley Erin became the last awarded actress in this category, for her role as Kiki Jerome on General Hospital. In October 2019, the NATAS decided to replace both younger actor and actress categories with a single, gender-neutral one: Outstanding Younger Performer in a Drama Series.

Winners and nominees
Listed below are the winners of the award for each year, as well as the other nominees.

1980s

1990s

2000s

2010s

Multiple wins and nominations

The following individuals received two or more wins in this category:

The following individuals received two or more nominations in this category:

Series with most awards

References

External links
 

Younger Actress in a Drama Series
Awards established in 1985
Awards for young actors
Awards disestablished in 2019
2019 disestablishments in the United States
1985 establishments in the United States